Forbidden Fruit is an album by Nina Simone. It was her second studio album for Colpix. The rhythm section accompanying her is the same trio as on both live albums before and after this release.

Song information
 "Gin House Blues", Simone re-recorded this song in a more upbeat way on 'Nuff Said! (1968).
 "Work Song", written by Oscar Brown, Jr and Nat Adderley tells the story of a chain gang. This song also appears on Nina’s Choice (1963), Nina Simone with Strings (1966) and, newly recorded, on High Priestess of Soul (1967).
 "Forbidden Fruit", the title song, one of three on the album by Oscar Brown, Jr. This "humorous up-tempo take on Adam and Eve was part nursery rhyme, part call and response."

Reception

The contemporaneous DownBeat reviewer commented that Forbidden Fruit was not a jazz album, but added that "Simone demonstrates here that she has the equipment and some of the potential to be a fairly good jazz vocalist".

Track listing
 "Rags and Old Iron" (Norman Curtis (m), Oscar Brown, Jr (l))
 "No Good Man" (Dan Fisher, Irene Higginbotham, Sammy Gallop)
 "Gin House Blues" (Fletcher Henderson (m), Henry Troy (l))
 "I'll Look Around" (George C. Cory (m), Douglas Cross (l))
 "I Love to Love" (Lennie Hayton (m), Herbert Baker (l))
 "Work Song" (Nat Adderley (m), Oscar Brown, Jr (l))
 "Where Can I Go Without You?" (Victor Young (m), Peggy Lee (l))
 "Just Say I Love Him" (Dicitencello vuje) (Rodolfo Falvo (m), Enzo Fusco (l); Music adaptation: Jack Val and Jimmy Dale, English lyrics: Sam Ward and Martin Kalmanoff)
 "Memphis in June" (Hoagy Carmichael (m), Paul Francis Webster (l))
 "Forbidden Fruit" (Oscar Brown, Jr)

The 2005 CD version by EMI features 11 bonus tracks roughly recorded at the same time, themselves adding up to a kind of "lost album" of approximately 40 minutes. Four of the songs - Porgy, I Is Your Woman Now, Baubles, Bangles and Beads, Gimme a Pigfoot (a different take), and Spring Is Here - were previously issued on Nina Simone with Strings in edited form with an overdubbed string section.
 "Porgy, I Is Your Woman Now" (George Gershwin (m), DuBose Heyward, Ira Gershwin (l))
 "Baubles, Bangles and Beads" (Robert Wright, George Forrest)
 "Gimme a Pigfoot" (Wesley Wilson)
 "Ev'rytime We Say Goodbye" (Cole Porter)
 "Spring Is Here" (Richard Rodgers (m), Lorenz Hart (l))
 "Lonesome Valley" (traditional)
 "Golden Earrings" (Jay Livingston, Victor Young (m), Ray Evans (l))
 "My Ship" (Kurt Weill (m), Ira Gershwin (l))
 "'Tain't Nobody's Biz-ness if I Do" (Porter Grainger, Robert Graham Prince, Clarence Williams, Everett Robbins)
 "Try a Little Tenderness" (Harry M. Woods, Jimmy Campbell, Reg Connelly)
 "Od Yesh Homa" (traditional)

Personnel
Nina Simone – vocals, piano
Al Schackman – guitar
Chris White – bass
Bobby Hamilton – drums

References

1961 albums
Nina Simone albums
Colpix Records albums